Karapakkam  is an area of Chennai, in Tamil Nadu, India. It is one of the stops on the Old Mahabalipuram Road, or commonly referred to as OMR. It is situated between the IT Hubs of Thoraipakkam and Sholinganallur. It is parallel to Injambakkam on the ECR Highway.

Karapakkam, which is a part of the Greater Chennai (pop: 4,500 approx.) is home to a number of  BPO, IT/ITES companies and other IT/ITES companies such as Mahindra Satyam, Pantheon, Scope International, Capgemini India, Tata Consultancy Services, Accenture India, Cognizant Technology Solutions, Photon Infotech and Infosys are situated along the Rajiv Gandhi Salai (OMR).

It has a Panchayat Elementary school, a government high school and Hindustan International School - CBSE. Annai Fathima Home for the Aged and Tsunami victims is also located in Karapakkam.

It is 10 km from Thiruvanmiyur. Arulmigu Drupadi Amman, Arulmigu Gangai Amman, Arulmigu Vendavarasi Amman, and Arulmigu Kali Amman temples are some of the places of worship there.

Thangavelu Engineering college, KCG College of Technology and Hindustan International School (Karapakkam Campus) are located here.

References 

Villages in Chengalpattu district
Neighbourhoods in Chennai